In the 1936 season of the Campeonato Carioca, two championships were disputed, each by a different league.

FMD Championship

The edition of the Campeonato Carioca organized by FMD (Federação Metropolitana de Desportos, or Metropolitan Sports Federation) kicked off on July 5, 1936 and ended on March 14, 1937. Seven teams participated. Vasco da Gama won the championship for the 5th time. no teams were relegated.

System
The tournament would be disputed in three stages: 
First round: All seven teams play in a single round-robin format against each other. The team with the most points qualifies to the Finals.
Second round: All seven teams play in a single round-robin format against each other. The team with the most points qualifies to the Finals.
Finals: The round winners play in a best-of-three points series for the title.

Championship

First round

Playoffs

Second round

Finals

LCF Championship

The edition of the Campeonato Carioca organized by LCF (Liga Carioca de Football, or Carioca Football League) kicked off on September 23, 1936 and ended on December 27, 1936. As in the previous year, Six teams participated - the five full members of the league and a guest from the Subliga Carioca de Football. Originally, this guest would be the previous year's champion of that league, Engenho de Dentro, but when that team joined FMD instead, Jequiá, runners-up of the 1934 Subliga, were invited. Fluminense won the championship for the 10th time. no teams were relegated.

System
The tournament would be disputed in a triple round-robin format, with the team with the most points winning the title.

Championship

Finals

References

Campeonato Carioca seasons
Carioca